Michalis Michael (born 27 April 1987) is a defender, who went through the Academies of AEK Larnaca.
Since 2006 he was promoted to the first team of AEK Larnaca.

External links
Profile at Cyprus Football Association
Profile at Playmaker Stats

1987 births
Living people
AEK Larnaca FC players
Cypriot footballers
Association football defenders
Greek Cypriot people
ASIL Lysi players